Rahnich (also Romanized as Rahnīch; also known as Rahneshk and Rahnīeh) is a village in Shakhenat Rural District, in the Central District of Birjand County, South Khorasan Province, Iran. At the 2006 census, its population was 133, in 45 families.

References 

Populated places in Birjand County